Compote can refer to:
 Compote, a dessert of stewed fruits, or a compote bowl or dish (often simply called "a compote"), the wide, flat, often stemmed vessel in which dessert compote is traditionally served
 Compote (game dish), a stewed game meat dish
 Kompot, a punch-like fruit drink in parts of Europe, and also a slang term for a crude preparation of heroin